The Patent Leather Kid is a 1927 American silent drama film about a self-centered boxer who performs a heroic act in World War I that severely wounds him. It was directed by Alfred Santell and stars Richard Barthelmess, Molly O'Day, Lawford Davidson, Matthew Betz and Arthur Stone.

The film was adapted by Gerald C. Duffy (titles), Winifred Dunn, Casey Robinson (uncredited) and Adela Rogers St. Johns from the story by Rupert Hughes.

Barthelmess was nominated for the Academy Award for Best Actor.

A copy of the film is held by the Library of Congress and a 16mm print exists at the Wisconsin Center for Film and Theater Research.

Cast
 Richard Barthelmess as the Patent Leather Kid
 Molly O'Day as Curley Boyle
 Lawford Davidson as Lt. Hugo Breen
 Matthew Betz as Jake Stuke
 Arthur Stone as Jimmy Kinch
 Ray Turner as Mabile Molasses
 Hank Mann as Sergeant
 Walter James as Officer Riley
 Lucien Prival as the German Officer
 Nigel De Brulier as the French Doctor
 Fred O'Beck as Tank Crew
 Clifford Salam as Tank Crew
 Henry Murdock as Tank Crew
 Charles Sullivan as Tank Crew
 John Kolb as Tank Crew
 Al Alleborn as Tank Crew
 Billy Bletcher as Fight Fan (uncredited)
 Fred Kelsey as Fight Fan (uncredited)
 Lafe McKee as Fight Spectator (uncredited)

References

External links

1927 films
American black-and-white films
American silent feature films
1927 drama films
Films directed by Alfred Santell
First National Pictures films
Silent American drama films
Films with screenplays by Gerald Duffy
Films about paraplegics or quadriplegics
1920s American films